The Madurai Nayaks were rulers of Telugu origin from around 1529 until 1736, of a region comprising most of modern-day Tamil Nadu, India, with Madurai as their capital. The Nayak reign was an era noted for its achievement in arts, cultural and administrative reforms, revitalization of temples previously ransacked by the Delhi Sultans, and the inauguration of a unique architectural style.

The Madurai Nayaks had their social origins the Balija warrior-merchant clans, particularly in states of Andhra Pradesh and Tamil Nadu.

The dynasty consisted of 13 rulers, of whom 9 were kings, 2 were queens, and 2 were joint-kings. The most notable of these were King  Tirumala Nayaka, and Queen Rani Mangammal. Foreign trade was conducted mainly with the Dutch and the Portuguese, as the British and the French had not yet made inroads into the region.

History

Origins 
Originally, the Nayakas were Telugu-speaking Warrior-merchants, who started as kartakkals (agents) of the Vijayanagar empire in southern regions of what would become Tamil Nadu. That region had long been a troubled province due to its distance from Vijayanagara and had been only been fully subjugated in the early 16th century under Veera Narasimha. The first Nayaka, Nangama, was a popular and able general of Krishnadevaraya. Krishnadevaraya sent Nangama Nayaka with a large army to bring Pandya Nadu back under imperial control. Although he was an able administrator he was a hard ruler and rejected any claims of authority from the petty chieftains, which made him unpopular. In addition, experienced officers like Nangama Nayaka were chafing under the strict control Krishnadevaraya imposed on them. Towards the end of Krishnadevaraya's reign, trouble erupted in the south as the Chola Nayakas openly revolted and fled to Travancore, while Nangama began defying central orders while still claiming power of deputy. In response, the emperor sent Nangama's son, Viswanatha, with a large army to recapture Madurai. Viswanatha Nayaka defeated his father and sent him as prisoner to Krishnadevaraya, who in turned pardoned Nangama Nayaka for his valued service. After defeating his father Krishnadevaraya made Viswanatha governor of Madurai and other Tamil provinces in 1529, beginning the Madurai Nayaka dynasty.

Another story goes that the Pandyas were under attack from the Cholas and appealed to Krishnadevaraya for help. He then sent Nangama Nayaka to restore the Pandyas to their rightful throne. Nangama defeated the Cholas, but instead claimed the throne for himself and deposed the Pandyan king. So Krishnadevaraya sent Nangama's son Viswanatha Nayaka to defeat him, which he did. Thus he was made nayaka of the region. However, this story does not have epigraphic evidence to support it.

Rise to power
Viswanatha Nayaka was not originally independent, but was treated as just another governor who the emperor had sent to keep control over the provinces. Originally he had control over Chola Nadu as well, which was ruled by a feudatory Chola prince, but this was transferred to the Thanjavur Nayakas. In 1544, Viswanatha Nayaka helped Aliya Rama Raya's army subdue Travancore, which had been refusing to pay tribute.

Vishwanatha also rebuilt fortifications at Madurai and made travel safer. He cleared the jungle around the banks of the Kaveri near Tiruchirappalli and destroyed hideouts of robbers there. He also expanded the borders of the kingdom so it included most of modern southern and western Tamil Nadu at his death. However, many of the local chieftains were still chafing under his rule, and so to appease them, Viswanatha's chief minister, Ariyanatha Mudaliar, assisted him in using the palayam or poligar system. The system was a quasi-fedual organisation of the country, which was divided into multiple palayams or small provinces; and each palayam was ruled by a palayakkarar or a petty chief. Ariyanatha organized the Pandyan kingdom into 72 palayams and ruled over the 72 dry-zone poligar chiefs. Of these 72, Kurvikulam and Ilayarasanendal, which were ruled by Kamma Nayakas of the Pemmasani, Komatineni and Ravella clans, were considered royal palayams. In the last year of his life he abdicated the throne and was alive for his son's investiture with ruling power in 1564, and died thereafter.Viswanatha's son, Krishnappa, was crowned in 1564. He immediately faced threats from nobles disgruntled with the new palayam system brought in by his father. These nobles, led by Tumbichchi Nayaka instigated a revolt among some of the polygars, which was crushed by Krishnappa. In the same year, he sent a contingent to the Battle of Talikota but it could not arrive in time. This defeat made the Nayakas virtually independent. When the king of Kandy, a friend of Tumbichchi Nayaka, stopped sending tribute, Krishnappa then led an invasion of Kandy. In this invasion he killed the king of Kandy, sent the late king's wife and children to Anuradhapura and placed his own brother-in-law Vijaya Gopala Naidu as his viceroy there to ensure tribute.

After his death in 1572, power in the kingdom went to his son Virappa Nayaka. Some documents claim the two sons of Krishnappa Nayaka were co-rulers, while other historians claim some member of the royal family was associated with rule, but not actually a ruler, like a yuva raja system in many of the princely states. During this time he crushed another revolt of polygars who were illegitimate descendants of the Pandyas. Virappa reigned over a period of relative stability. His relations with his nominal Vijayanagara overlords varied by their strength, but were generally cordial. After his death in 1595, power passed to his eldest son Krishnappa Nayaka II. During this time he led an occupation of Travancore and recognized Venkatapati Raya as emperor of VIjayanagar. During his reign, Ariyanatha Mudaliar died, and he himself died in 1601.

Height of power 
After his death a succession crisis arose and Krishnappa Nayaka II's youngest brother, Kasturi Rangappa, seized the throne but was assassinated a week later. Muttu Krishnappa Nayaka, the son of Krishnappa Nayaka II's second brother, became ruler. His rule was mainly focused on the organization of the southern coast, mainly inhabited by the Paravars. The community was excellent at fishing and pearl diving, which made them a valuable revenue source, but the region had generally been neglected by previous Nayakas. The region gradually became lawless and fell under Portuguese control. However when the Portuguese asserted the coast was now theirs and began to collect taxes, Muttu Krishnappa started sending officers called Sethupathis to modern Ramanathapuram, where their duties were to protect pilgrims going to Rameswaram and to compel the Portuguese to respect Nayaka authority in the region. Muttu Krishnappa Nayak is credited with the founding of Sethupathi dynasty in Ramnad.

He was succeeded by his son Muttu Virappa Nayaka in 1609, who desired greater independence from his Vijayanagara overlords and thus stopped paying tribute regularly. After the death of Venkatapati Raya in 1614, a nobleman Gobburi Jagga Raya murdered his successor Sriranga II and his family. This fomented a succession crisis in the Vijayanagara empire developed and civil war broke out between him and Rama Deva Raya, Sriranga II's son, who had escaped. Madurai, Gingee and the Portuguese supported the side of Jagga Raya while Raghunatha Nayaka of Thanjavur and Yachama Nayaka of Kalahasti were among those supporting Rama Deva Raya. In the Battle of Toppur in 1616, the generalship of Raghunatha and Yachama led to a crushing defeat for Jagga Raya's forces, and he was killed. Muttu Virappa was forced to pay a huge tribute to the Centre. He then shifted his capital to Tiruchirappalli later that year so that he could more easily launch an invasion of Thanjavur if he wanted to, but this failed. However, his appeasement of his Pandyan vassals meant they were loyal when Mysore invaded Dindigul in 1620 and was repelled. He died in 1623.

Muttu Virappa was succeeded by his brother Tirumala Nayaka, either as de facto or de jure ruler, in 1623. One of his first acts was to shift the capital back to Madurai, both as a better protection against invasion and its religious significance. The change took 10 years and was finally done in 1635. He also increased the army size to 30,000 to better work against. The kingdom was invaded again by Mysore in 1625, but Tirumala and his generals Ramappayya and Ranganna Nayaka crushed the invasion and launched a counterattack in which they laid siege to Mysore. Later in 1635, Travancore stopped paying tribute to Madurai so Tirumala Nayaka sent armies to attack him, which forced Travancore to resume tribute payments. In 1635, Tirumala Nayaka sent Ramappayya against the Sethupathi of Ramnad, who had rejected his decision on a succession matter. In this campaign, the Portuguese supported Tirumala Nayaka, and in return he allowed them to build a fortress and station a small garrison wherever they might want.

During this time, the Vijayanagara empire was falling fast and so Tirumala Nayaka cancelled tribute payment altogether. However when Sriranga III took power, he viewed this as an act of rebellion and assembled a large army to subdue his vassal. Tirumala allied with Thanjavur and Gingee, but Thanjavur defected to the emperor. Madurai then made a new alliance with the Golconda Sultanate, who laid siege to Vellore and defeated Sriranga III. When he then appealed to his Nayakas for an alliance, all rejected him and Vijayanagara fell altogether. Goldonda, which conquered Vellore around 1646, laid siege to Gingee along with the Bijapur Sultanate. Tirumala Nayaka's armies arrived too late to save the fortress.

In 1655, Mysore launched another invasion of Madurai when Tirumala was on his sickbed, and so he entrusted his defense to the Sethupathi of Ramnad, who had just emerged from a period of chaos. Ragunatha Thevar managed to drive back Mysore and in return all tribute was cancelled from him.

Decline 

Tirumala was succeeded by his son in 1659, who ruled for only four months, and then was succeeded by Chokkanatha Nayaka. In the first part of his reign, his army commander and chief minister revolted, supported by Thanjavur. He crushed the insurgents and invaded Thanjavur in retaliation, briefly placing his brother Muddu Alagiri as ruler there. But Madurai soon lost control of the region as Alagiri declared his independence and the Marathas under Venkoji conquered the province in 1675. Chokkanatha then waged war with Mysore and lost more territory, but his successor Muttu Virappa III recaptured it. After his death in 1689, Muttu Virappa III was succeeded by his infant son with Rani Mangammal, Virappa's mother, as regent. With the Mughal juggernaut approaching southern India, Rani Mangammal recognised it would be better to pay tribute to the Mughals than have them invade. She supporter their capture of Jinji from Rajaram, who would otherwise have attacked Madurai and Thanjavur, and ruled the fort as a Mughal vassal.

Muttu Virappa III's son Vijayaranga Chokkanatha reached maturity in 1704. However, he was more interested in scholarship and learning than ruling, and so real power fell to his chief counselor and commander of the army, who were known to abuse their power prodigiously. After his death in 1732, his wife, Queen Meenakshi, decided to adopt the son of Bangaru Tirumalai Nayaka, a member of the royal house. However there was severe strife between Bangaru Tirumalai and Meenakshi, and he led an uprising against her. In 1734, the Nawab of Arcot sent an expedition south to demand tribute and fealty from the kingdoms there, and in desperation, Meenakshi gave tribute to the Nawab's son-in-law, Chanda Sahib, to form an alliance. Bangaru Tirumalai retreated to the far south, in Madurai, and organized a large force of disgruntled polygars in 1736. Although they took Dindigul, Meenakshi and Chanda Sahib organized an army to attack Tirumalai. At the battle of Ammayanayakkanur near Dindigul, Bangaru Tirumalai's forces were defeated and he fled to Sivaganga. Once he was admitted into the Tiruchirappalli fort, however, Chanda Sahib declared himself king and imprisoned Meenakshi in her palace, ending the Madurai Nayakas for good. Tradition states she poisoned herself in 1739.

Descendants

Some of the family members of Vangaru Thirumalai established the Nayak dynasty in Sri Lanka known as the Kandy Nayaks. They ruled till 1815 with Kandy as their capital and were also the last ruling dynasty of Sri Lanka. The Kings of Kandy had from an early time sought marrriages with Madurai and many of the queens were from Madurai. The Kandy Nayaks received military support from the Nayaks of Madurai in fighting off the Portuguese. And in the 17th and 18th centuries, marital alliances between the Kandyan kings and Nayak princesses had become a matter of policy.

Administration 
The Madurai Nayakas followed a decentralized governance style. The king was supreme ruler, but his main advisor was the dalavai, who controlled both civil and military matters. The three most effective dalavais were Ariyanatha Mudaliar, Eamppayya and Narasappayya. The next most important figure was the pradhani or finance minister, and then the rayasam, chief of the bureaucracy. The kingdom was divided into provinces and local areas, each with its own governor and bureaucracy. The most basic unit was the village. Revenue would be earned through taxes on land.

The Nayakas also had a parallel system of administration. They divided their territory into 72 palayams, each of which was ruled by a palaiyakkarar, better known as polygar. These warrior-chiefs had a significant amount of autonomy from the centre and held powers of law enforcement and judicial administration. In return, they would give one-third of the palaiyam's revenue to the Nayaka and another third for the upkeep of an army. Often, however, the polygars were completely outside central control and would raid and pillage nearby territory.

Culture

Language 
The main languages of Nayaka rule were Telugu and Tamil. Tamil was mainly used by the common people, although there were some Telugu cultivators in the region. The Madurai Nayakas, on the other hand, had Telugu as mother tongue but could also speak Tamil.

Literature 
The Nayakas were great patrons of literature in Telugu, Tamil and Sanskrit. Although most kings patronized mainly poetry (considered "divine"), under Nayaka patronage Telugu prose flourished.

The earliest Muslim work in Tamil that survives complete is a translation by Vaṇṇapparimaḷappulavar of the Persian Book of One Thousand Questions that was presented at the Madurai court in 1572.

Art and architecture 
The Nayakas were some of the most prolific architects in South India. Much of their work was expansions and additions to existing Vijayanagara or pre-Vijayanagara structures. By far their greatest work was the Meenakshi-Surendeswara complex in Madurai, which is known for its four towering gopurams up to 50 metres in height. The original structure that stood there during Pandyan times was neglected during the Madurai Sultanate and fell into ruin, and the Vijayanagara rulers had begun to rebuild it. However the Nayakas made the most extensive contributions to the temple complex. Each of the additions to the temple was done by different rulers in different stages, and almost all rulers of the dynasty, or their wives and ministers, made generous donations to the temple and its construction so that it grew to a size of 254 by 238 metres. The Nayakas mainly followed the Dravidian style of architecture, with much emphasis on towering structures and elaborate carving. Much of the work centered around the addition of various mandapas, or columnated halls, filled with a variety of carved pillars such as the pudu mandapa directly adjoining the complex. Other important works included the Azhagar kovil and Tiruparankundram Murugan Kovil in the outskirts of Madurai, as well as the expansion of the Ranganathaswamy temple complex in Srirangam. In the case of the Ranganathaswamy temple, the Nayakas expanded the original shrine to be seven concentric enclosures, each topped with towering gopurams. However this project was incomplete when the Nayak dynasty fell and has since been continued into the modern-day.

Although temple architecture was the main pursuit of the Nayakas, they constructed other buildings as well. Thirumala Nayaka is famous for his huge Thirumalai Nayakar Mahal, which George Mitchell speculated must have been the largest of all royal residences in the 17th century, develops earlier palace architecture from the Vijayanagara period. This architecture includes both completely indigenous elements such as square and rectangular bases with u-shaped ascending floors with numerous courts and verandahs, as well as double-curved eaves, gopuram-like towers and plastered sculptures as well as elements borrowed from the Bahmanis such as significant presence of arches, cusps, and geometric designs. This Vijayanagara style was blended with indigenous Tamil architecture, for instance, the use of cylindrical columns like Tamil wooden architecture, to create new architectural styles for grand buildings such as the Thirumalai Nayakar Mahal. Only two sections of this palace still stand, the dance hall and audience hall.

The Nayakas also did many public works projects such as irrigation canals and fortresses.

Nayaka coins 
Some early Madurai Nayaka coins portray the figure of the king. The bull also is seen frequently on the Madurai Nayak coins. Chokkanatha Nayak, one of the last rulers of the dynasty, issued coins displaying various animals, such as the bear, elephant and lion. He also issued coins featuring Hanuman and Garuda. The inscriptions on the Nayak coins are in Tamil, Telugu, Kannada, and Nagari scripts. Unlike the coins of many of the earlier dynasties, the Nayak coins are easily available for coin-collectors.

See also
 Thirumalai Nayakkar Mahal
 Thanjavur Nayak kingdom
 Nayaks of Gingee

References

External links

 Images of Nayak kings 
 The Hindu : Crafted coins
 Namma Madurai: From Vedas to military strategies – The Hindu
 Images of Nayak kings found in Sri Nellaiyappar Temple – TAMIL NADU – The Hindu
 Thirumalai Nayak period inscription found at temple – The Hindu
 
 

States and territories established in 1529
States and territories disestablished in 1736
 
Telugu people
Dynasties of India
Hindu monarchs
Telugu monarchs
History of Tiruchirappalli
History of Tamil Nadu